Muli is both a given name and a surname. Notable people with the name include:

Muli Avishar (born 1947), Israeli basketball player
Muli Katzurin (born 1954), Israeli basketball coach
Tang Muli (born 1947), Chinese painter and poet